Mint, also known as Intuit Mint (styled in its logo as intuit mint with dotted 't' characters in "intuit" and undotted 'i' characters) and formerly known as Mint.com, is a personal financial management website and mobile app for the US and Canada produced by Intuit, Inc. (which also produces TurboTax, QuickBooks, and Credit Karma).

Mint.com was originally created by Aaron Patzer and provided account aggregation through a deal with Yodlee, but switched to using Intuit's own system for connecting to accounts after it was purchased by Intuit in 2009.  It was later renamed from "Mint.com" to just "Mint". Mint's primary service allows users to track bank, credit card, investment, and loan balances and transactions through a single user interface, as well as create budgets and set financial goals.

As of 2010, Mint.com claimed to connect with more than 16,000 US and Canadian financial institutions, and to support more than 17 million individual financial accounts. In 2016, Mint.com claimed to have over 20 million users.

Investment and finances
Mint raised over $31M in venture capital funding from DAG Ventures, Shasta Ventures, and First Round Capital, as well as from angel investors including Ram Shriram, an early investor in Google. The latest round of $14M was closed on August 4, 2009, and reported by CEO Aaron Patzer as preemptive. TechCrunch later pegged the valuation of Mint at $140M.

In February 2008, revenue was generated through lead generation, earned via earning referral fees from recommendations of  highly personalized, targeted financial products to its users.

Sale
On September 13, 2009, TechCrunch reported Intuit would acquire Mint for $170 million.  An official announcement was made the following day.

On November 2, 2009, Intuit announced their acquisition of Mint.com was complete. The former CEO of Mint.com, Aaron Patzer, was named vice president and general manager of Intuit’s personal finance group, responsible for Mint.com and all Quicken online, desktop, and mobile offerings. Patzer further added the features of the online product Mint.com would be incorporated into the Intuit's Quicken desktop product, and vice versa, as two collaborative aspects of the Intuit Personal Finance team. Patzer left Intuit in December 2012.

Controversial practices

Security
Mint asks users to provide both the user names and the passwords to their bank accounts, credit cards, and other financial accounts, which Mint then stores in their databases in a decryptable format.  This has raised concerns that if the Mint databases were ever hacked, both user names and passwords would become available to rogue third parties. Some banks support a separate "access code" for read-only access to financial information, which reduces the risk to some degree.

In January 2017, Intuit and JPMorgan Chase settled a longstanding dispute, and agreed to develop software where Chase customers send their data, for financial purposes, to Mint without having Intuit store customers' names and passwords. It was also agreed Intuit would never sell Chase’s customer data.

See also
Personal financial management
Wikinvest

References

Further reading

External links
 

2006 establishments in California
American companies established in 2006
Financial services companies established in 2006
Account aggregation providers
Accounting software
Intuit software
Companies based in Mountain View, California
Software companies established in 2006
Finance websites
IOS software
Android (operating system) software
WatchOS software
2009 mergers and acquisitions